Hon. Essylt Priscilla "Pip" Scott-Ellis (15 November 1916 – 1983) was a British diarist. She was one of only two women who volunteered to be nurses for the Nationalists during the Spanish Civil War.

Life
Ellis was born in Seaford House in Belgravia in 1916. She was the daughter of Margherita (born van Raalte) and Thomas Scott-Ellis, 8th Baron Howard de Walden. She was educated at Queen's College, London, privately, at Benenden School and at a finishing school in Paris. Her siblings were Elisabeth Gwendolen (later Robinson) (1914-1976), Hon. Bronwen Mary (later Lindsay) (1912-2003) and John Osmael Scott-Ellis, 9th Baron Howard de Walden (1912-1999).

It is said that her parents gave her only a small amount of their time and attention and she described as eager to please. She was obsessed by Prince Ataúlfo de Orleans who was a closet homosexual. He volunteered to be sent from Nazi Germany in the Condor Legion to support the Nationalist forces in Spain. Ellis wanted to be close to him.

In 1937 she found out that her friend had volunteered to serve as a nurse to support the Nationalist forces during the Spanish Civil War. She decided that she would do the same and after basic training she was in Spain in October 1937. While she was working as a nurse she wrote a diary noting the wounds, the screaming and the casual approach to sterisation.

She met a diplomat José Luis de Vilallonga y Cabeza de Vaca, 9th Marquess of Castellbell in January 1944 and they married at Sanlúcar on 20 September 1945. Her family did not approve and none of them could attend the wedding. His father-in-law was so unimpressed by him that he had his will changed in the faint hope of protecting his daughter's inheritance. After their marriage her husband left the Spanish diplomatic service and they lived abroad.

She married José Luis de Vilallonga y Cabeza de Vaca, 9th Marquess of Castellbell, on 27 September 1945 (see Marquess of Castellbell). 

She married, secondly, Ian Hanson, a young opera singer from Manchester, in 1972

Death and legacy
Ellis died in 1983 in Los Angeles. Her diary which she had started to edit for publication in 1939 became The Chances of Death. This book was published in 1995 after it was edited by the historian Sir Raymond Carr.

References

1916 births
1983 deaths
People from Belgravia
Diarists
People educated at Queen's College, London